Antonio Soler Mulet (born 23 March 1992) is a Spanish footballer who plays as a defensive midfielder.

Playing career

Youth and college 
After playing with the Villarreal academy and having various spells in the lower leagues in Spain, Soler moved to the United States in 2015 to play college soccer at Adelphi University. He moved to the University of Tampa in 2018 for his senior year.

While at college, Soler also appeared for Premier Development League side South Georgia Tormenta.

Club

New Mexico United
On 11 November 2018, Soler was signed by USL Championship expansion club New Mexico United ahead of its inaugural season.

References

External links 

 
 Adelphi University profile
 University of Tampa profile

1992 births
Living people
Adelphi Panthers men's soccer players
Association football midfielders
Footballers from Valencia (city)
Spanish expatriate footballers
Spanish expatriate sportspeople in the United States
Spanish footballers
Tampa Spartans men's soccer players
Tormenta FC players
USL Championship players
USL League Two players
La Roda CF players
New Mexico United players